"Shout" is the thirteenth single by Ant & Dec, formerly known as PJ & Duncan and the third to be taken from their final album, The Cult of Ant & Dec (1997). The single was released in March 1997, and reached number 10 in the UK Singles Chart. The song is in a pop rock style.

The song features backing vocals from Erasure's Andy Bell, and its chorus, "Shout.. come on, let it out" is influenced by the Tears for Fears' song "Shout" where the chorus begins with "Shout, shout, let it all out". The song also features a bass line that echoes that in Lou Reed's 1972 Walk On the Wild Side.

The music video sees Ant & Dec in a flat or hotel room, with Dec seated on the bed playing the acoustic guitar and Ant singing while seated on the floor. The video has film noir references and a Lou Reed lookalike dressed in a leather coat.

Track listing

Weekly charts

References

Ant & Dec songs
1997 singles
1996 songs
Songs written by Julian Gallagher
Song recordings produced by Richard Stannard (songwriter)
Telstar Records singles
Songs written by Declan Donnelly
Songs written by Anthony McPartlin